Yli-Maaria (Finnish; Övre S:t Marie in Swedish) is a district in the Maaria-Paattinen ward of the city of Turku, in Finland. It is located to the north of the city, and is a very sparsely populated area. The district was previously part of the municipality of Maaria, which was annexed into Turku in 1967.

The current population of Yli-Maaria is 2,209, and it is increasing at an annual rate of 3.71%. 32.10% of the district's population are under 15 years old, while 4.89% are over 65. The district's linguistic makeup is 97.24% Finnish, 1.49% Swedish, and 1.27% other.

See also
 Districts of Turku
 Districts of Turku by population

Districts of Turku